Sir Frederick Matthew Darley  (18 September 1830 – 4 January 1910) was the sixth Chief Justice of New South Wales, an eminent barrister, a member of the New South Wales Parliament, Lieutenant-Governor of New South Wales, and a member of the British Privy Council.

Early years
Darley was born in Ireland, the first child of Henry Darley (son of Frederick Darley) of Wingfield, Bray, County Wicklow and his wife Maria Louisa Darley (née West, daughter of Matthew West of Dublin). Darley's father was a member of the Irish bar and according to Bennett, he was described by Lord St Leonards as "not only the best officer in the Court of Chancery in Ireland, but the best officer he had ever come across".

Darley was educated at the Royal School Dungannon (sometimes known as "Dungannon College") in County Tyrone, Ireland where he had as a fellow student George Higinbotham was who afterwards to become Chief Justice of Victoria. Darley's uncle, the Reverend John Darley, was headmaster of the college.

In July 1847 Darley commenced studying at Trinity College Dublin, and he graduated in July 1851 with a Bachelor of Arts (BA). He was called to the English bar at the King's Inn in January 1853 but returned to Ireland and practised there for about nine years on the Munster circuit. He met Sir Alfred Stephen when Stephen was on a visit to Europe, and was told that there were good prospects for him in Australia. Darley married Lucy Forest Browne at Hunsdon, Hertfordshire, on 13 December 1860. Lucy was the sister of novelist Rolf Boldrewood (Thomas Alexander Browne) who is best known for the book Robbery under arms. Darley and Lucy had two sons and four daughters. One of their daughters Frederica Silvia Darley married firstly Sir Windham Robert Carmichael-Anstruther 9th Bt, and secondly the Hon. Major Algernon Henry Charles Hanbury-Tracey, their son became the 6th Baron Sudeley of Toddington.

Emigration to Australia
Darley decided to emigrate to Australia and arrived in Sydney in 1862. He was admitted to the NSW Bar on 2 June 1862 and was later appointed a Queen's Counsel (QC) in 1878. Biographer Percival Serle states that Darley had established a good practice, and that for the twenty years preceding his elevation to the bench, there was hardly an important case at Sydney in which he did not appear on one side or the other. Biographer John Bennett, on the other hand, states that Darley found his early years tiring and not particularly well remunerated, and that it was Darley's zeal rather than his legal skills that brought him to attention.

In September 1868 he was appointed  to the New South Wales Legislative Council. Serle states that he was a constant and conscientious attendant at its debates. In November 1881 he became Vice-President of the Executive Council and Representative of the Government in the Legislative Council in the third Henry Parkes ministry. In parliament Darley introduced "an equity act, a divorce act, which gave to the wife the same rights as those of the husband, and the act authorizing marriage with a deceased wife's sister". In November 1886 Darley was offered the position of Chief Justice of New South Wales in succession to Sir James Martin. He did not desire the office and to accept it would have meant a considerable monetary sacrifice. As a barrister, he was probably earning more than twice the amount of the salary offered. Darley declined the position and it was accepted by Julian Salomons who subsequently resigned a few days later.

Appointment as Chief Justice

Darley was again approached, and this time he accepted it. He was sworn in on 7 December 1886. He carried out his duties with great distinction, although Bennett notes that Darley was not an exceptional jurist. Sir Samuel Way, Chief Justice of South Australia, spoke of him "as in many respects the noblest figure we have ever had on the Australian bench".

On the retirement of Sir Alfred Stephen in November 1891, Darley was appointed Lieutenant-Governor of New South Wales, and he administered the government seven times in that capacity. When the position of Governor of New South Wales became vacant in 1901, Serle notes that there were many suggestions that Darley should be given the post, but the post was given to Sir Harry Rawson.

Darley's longest period administering the government was from 1 November 1900 to 27 May 1902, a significant period in Australia's political history with the lead up to and the aftermath of federation of the then Australian colonies. But his anxiety for New South Wales's supremacy may have contributed to the 'Hopetoun Blunder'. According to Bennett, Darley's private assessment in 1902 was that 'Australian Federation is so far a pronounced failure'.

Honours and later years
Darley was knighted in 1887, created a Knight Commander of the Order of St Michael and St George (KCMG) in 1897, and received the Knight Grand Cross of the Order of St Michael and St George (GCMG) on 15 May 1901, in preparation of the forthcoming royal visit of the Duke and Duchess of Cornwall and York (later King George V and Queen Mary).

He visited England in 1902 and was appointed a member of the Royal Commission set up to investigate the conduct of the Second Boer War (the Elgin Commission 1902–1903). He was also appointed a member of the privy council in 1905.

He died in London on 4 January 1910.

Trivia
Mary McCarron Maguire composed the "Katoomba Waltz" in honour of Darley and Lady Darley.

Darley Road at Randwick, Sydney was renamed from Boundary Street in honour of Darley.

Darley lived at Quambi, Albert Street, Woollahra and had a mountain retreat "Lilianfels" in Katoomba. This retreat is now a hotel, and "Quambi" was demolished in the 1930s to become Quambi Place.

Outside Katoomba, on the edge of the Jamison Valley, there is a lookout named after Lady Darley, and a park called Darley Park.

See also
List of judges of the Supreme Court of New South Wales

Notes

References

Sources
Alex Castles, A Legal History of Australia, Law Book Co, 1975.

1830 births
1910 deaths
Chief Justices of New South Wales
Lieutenant-Governors of New South Wales
Judges of the Supreme Court of New South Wales
Australian Knights Grand Cross of the Order of St Michael and St George
Australian Knights Bachelor
Australian politicians awarded knighthoods
Australian King's Counsel
Colony of New South Wales judges
Australian members of the Privy Council of the United Kingdom
19th-century Australian judges
20th-century Australian judges
Members of the New South Wales Legislative Council